May Heatherly (born Mary Gay Prindle; May 13, 1942 – October 6, 2015) was an American actress who worked primarily in Spain. A native of Los Angeles, California, Heatherly spent her childhood there before relocating with her family to Spain. After working as an actress in Spain, she went on to appear in some U.S. television, including a recurring guest role on The Man from U.N.C.L.E. (1964). Her film credits include The Cups of San Sebastian (1967), Open Season (1974),  From Hell to Victory (1979), Pieces (1982), and Edge of the Axe (1988).

In addition to her acting career, Heatherly also trained in bullfighting in the 1960s, and at one time considered making a career in it. She died in Madrid in October 2015, aged 73.

Early life
Heatherly was born Mary Gay Prindle on May 13, 1942 in Los Angeles, California. When she was eleven years old, she relocated with her family to Spain, where her businessman father took a job opportunity.

Career
In the early 1960s, Heatherly began working in Spain as an actress, appearing in the films Ella y el miedo (1962), Los muertos no perdonan (1963), and Torrejón City (1964). During this period in Spain, Heatherly also trained to be a bullfighter,  and considered making a career of it. Heatherly returned to the United States in later 1964 to appear in a recurring guest role as Heather McNabb on The Man from U.N.C.L.E..

She subsequently appeared in the Spanish-based production The Cups of San Sebastian (1967) alongside Tab Hunter, followed by a small role in the American drama film Love and Pain and the Whole Damn Thing (1973) directed by Alan J. Pakula and starring Maggie Smith. Heatherly also had roles in the European-based thrillers The Killer Is One of 13 (1973) and The Student Connection (1974), followed by Open Season (1974), which starred Peter Fonda and William Holden.

After appearing in a number of Spanish-based productions, Heatherly was cast in José Ramón Larraz's slasher film Pieces (1982), portraying the overbearing, abusive mother of the film's killer villain. She subsequently had a supporting role in the drama Crystal Heart (1986), starring Tawny Kitaen. She later reunited with director José Ramón Larraz, appearing in his 1988 slasher film Edge of the Axe.

In 2006, Heatherly has a minor part in the Miloš Forman-directed drama Goya's Ghosts.

Death
Heatherly underwent a hip replacement surgery in 2013. She died two years later on October 6, 2015 in Madrid, aged 73.

Selected filmography

Film

Television

References

Sources

External links

1942 births
2015 deaths
Actresses from Los Angeles
Actresses from Madrid
American film actresses
American television actresses
American expatriates in Spain
21st-century American women